Oakham was a rural district in Rutland, England from 1894 to 1974, covering the north of the county.  

The rural district had its origins in the Oakham Rural Sanitary District, formed in 1875. Oakham RSD had an identical area to Oakham poor law union, and consisted of thirty-one civil parishes of which twenty-nine were in Rutland and two in Leicestershire. 

The Local Government Act 1894 redesignated the area as Oakham Rural District, at the same time transferring the Leicestershire parishes of Cold Overton and Knossington to Melton Mowbray Rural District.

The rural district included the town of Oakham until 1911, when it was constituted as Oakham Urban District. The Rural District Council continued to be based in the town, however, at Catmose.

Parishes
The rural district consisted of the following parishes:

Ashwell
Barleythorpe
Barrow
Braunston
Brooke
Burley
Cottesmore
Edith Weston
Egleton
Empingham
Exton
Greetham
Gunthorpe
Hambleton
Horn
Langham
Leighfield
Lyndon
Manton
Martinsthorpe
Normanton
Oakham (until 1911)
Market Overton
Stretton
Teigh
Thistleton
Tickencote
Whissendine
Whitwell

References

History of Rutland
Local government in Rutland
Districts of England created by the Local Government Act 1894
Districts of England abolished by the Local Government Act 1972
Rural districts of England
Oakham